Rubén Darío El Pollo Sobrero (Buenos Aires, 1961) is the leader of the Haedo chapter of the rail workers trade union (UT) of Argentina. Divorced and father of four children, Sobrero is ideologically aligned with the Trotskyist left. He opposed the railroad trade union (UF), formerly led by Jose Pedraza, then convicted for the killing of activist Mariano Ferreyra in October 2010. The UF is currently presided by Juan Carlos Fernandez. Sobrero had accused Pedraza of being an "entrepreneur" and a member of the board of directors of Ferrocarril General Manuel Belgrano railway company.

On the morning of 30 September 2011 he was arrested in connection with arson attacks on railroad cars in May, and remained in custody until being released on 4 October 2011. Jorge Altamira, presidential candidate of the Workers Left Front, had called for his release. Sobrero was acquitted of all the charges on 11 November 2011.

References

External links 
Report in English
Statement by Jose Altamira (Spanish)

1961 births
Prisoners and detainees of Argentina
Argentine trade union leaders
Living people
People from Buenos Aires

Argentine socialists